Fót is a town in Pest county, Budapest metropolitan area, Hungary.

Location
The North Hungarian foothills lie to the west. The nearest settlement to the west is Dunakeszi, to the northeast are Csomád and Veresegyház, to the east is Mogyoród and Budapest is to the south.

Architecture
The older areas of Fót feature the notable Catholic Szeplőtelen Fogantatás (Immaculate Conception) Church, built between 1845 and 1855, and the Károlyi Palace, both designed by architect Miklós Ybl.

Notable people
Gábor Agárdy (1922–2006), actor of Armenian descent
József Cselényi (1899–1949), singer-songwriter
Zsolt Erdei (born 1974), professional boxer
András Fáy (1786–1864), politician and writer
Janos Garáy (1812–1853), poet, writer and journalist
Ádám Madaras (born 1966), pentathlete
András Stohl (born 1967), actor

Twin towns – sister cities

Fót is twinned with:
 Bălăușeri, Romania
 Batiovo, Ukraine
 San Benedetto dei Marsi, Italy

References

External links

  in Hungarian
 Street map 
 newspapers

Populated places in Pest County